The Croats of Bosnia and Herzegovina, often referred to as Bosnian Croats or Herzegovinian Croats, are the third most populous ethnic group in the country after Bosniaks and Serbs, and are one of the constitutive nation of Bosnia and Herzegovina. Croats of Bosnia and Herzegovina have made significant contributions to the culture of Bosnia and Herzegovina. Most Croats declare themselves Catholics and speakers of the Croatian language.

From the 15th to the 19th century, Catholics in Ottoman Bosnia and Herzegovina were often persecuted by the Ottoman Empire, causing many of them to flee the area. In the 20th century, political turmoil and poor economic conditions caused more to emigrate. Ethnic cleansing within Bosnia and Herzegovina in the 1990s saw Croats forced to go to different parts of Bosnia and Herzegovina, despite having lived in numerous regions prior to the Bosnian War. The 2013 population census in Bosnia and Herzegovina recorded 544,780 residents registering as of Croatian ethnicity.

History

Kingdom of Croatia

Croats settled the areas of modern Croatia and Bosnia and Herzegovina in the 7th century.Constantine VII in De Administrando Imperio writes that Croats settled Dalmatia and from there they settled Illyricum and Pannonia
There, they assimilated with native Illyrians and Romans during the great migration of the Slavs. The Croats adopted Christianity and began to develop their own culture, art, and political institutions, culminating in their own kingdom, which consisted of two principalities: Lower Pannonia ("Pannonian Croatia") in the north, and Dalmatian Croatia in the south. Red Croatia, to the south, was land of a few minor states. One of the most important events of the Croats in Bosnia and Herzegovina in the early Middle Ages is the First Croatian Assembly held in 753 in Županjac (present-day Tomislavgrad). The second major event was the coronation of Tomislav, the first King of Croatia, in ca. 925, in the fields of Županjac. By this act, Pannonian Croatia and Dalmatian Croatia formed a united Croatian kingdom, which included Dalmatia, Bosnia and Pannonia (eastern Slavonia and eastern Bosnia), and Savia (western Slavonia).

High and late middle age
In 1102 Croatia entered into a union with the Kingdom of Hungary. After this, Bosnia, which was earlier part of the Kingdom of Croatia, started to disassociate with Croatia. At first, Bosnia became a separate principality under Ban Kulin  who managed to solidify Bosnian autonomy at the expense of more powerful neighbours, but only in the 14th century did Bosnia become a formidable state. In the 14th century, King Tvrtko I conquered part of western Serbia and later parts of the Kingdom of Croatia, which he accomplished by defeating various Croatian nobles and supporting Hungary. Thus, the Kingdom of Bosnia emerged, but part of the present territory of Bosnia and Herzegovina remained in the Kingdom of Croatia.

Regarding culture and religion, Bosnia was closer to Croatia than the Orthodox lands to the east, and the Diocese of Bosnia is mentioned as Catholic in the 11th century, and later fell under the jurisdiction of the Croatian Archdiocese of Split and in the 12th Century under the jurisdiction of the Diocese of Dubrovnik. Another connection of Bosnia with Croatia is that Bosnian rulers always used the political title "Ban Kulin" in similarity to their Croatian counterparts. Due to the scarcity of historical records, there are no definite figures dealing with the religious composition of medieval Bosnia. However, some Croat scholars suggest that a majority of Bosnia's medieval population were Catholics who, according to Zlopaša, accounted for 700,000 of 900,000 of the total Bosnian population. Some 100,000 were members of the Bosnian Church and other 100,000 were Orthodox Christians.

Ottoman Empire

In the middle of the 15th century, the Ottoman Empire started to conquer Bosnia. In 1451 they took Vrhbosna province and conquered Bosnia in 1463. Herzegovina was conquered in 1481, while northern Bosnia was still under Hungary and Croatia until 1527 when it was conquered by the Ottomans. After the Turkish conquest, many Catholic Bosnians converted to Islam, and their numbers in some areas shrank as many fled from fear of conversion and persecution. The Ottoman conquest changed the demographics of Bosnia and Herzegovina, reducing the number of Catholics, and eliminating the Bosnian Church, whose members apparently converted to Islam en masse. The present-day boundaries of Bosnia and Herzegovina were made in 1699 when the Treaty of Karlowitz was signed in order to establish peace between the Austrian Empire and the Ottoman Empire. Another significant event for Bosnian Croats is the boundary established by an agreement between the Republic of Ragusa and the Ottoman Empire, where Ragusans promised to give in a part of their territory in Neum to the Ottomans in order to protect themselves from the Republic of Venice.

The activity of the Catholic Church was limited, while the Ottomans preferred the Orthodox Church because Catholicism was the faith of Austria, the Ottoman enemies, while Orthodoxy was common in Bosnia, and thus it was more acceptable to the Ottomans. In the first 50 years of Ottoman rule, many Catholics fled from Bosnia. A number of Catholics also converted to Orthodox Christianity. Franciscans were the only Catholic priests to be active in Bosnia. Before the Ottomans arrived in Bosnia, there were 35 Franciscan monasteries in Bosnia and four in Herzegovina. Some monasteries were destroyed and some were converted to mosques. In the 1680s there were only 10 Franciscan monasteries left in Bosnia. The Catholic Church in Bosnia divided its administration into two dioceses, one was the Croatian Bosnia diocese, the part which was not conquered by the Ottomans, and the other was Bosna Srebrena diocese.

Between 1516 and 1524, planned persecution and forced Islamization of Catholics occurred in Bosnia and Herzegovina. In that year, Franciscan monasteries in Kraljeva Sutjeska, Visoko, Fojnica, Kreševo and Konjic, and later in Mostar. It is believed that during that time, some 100,000 Croats converted to Islam. In 1528 the Ottomans conquered Jajce and Banja Luka, thus destroying the Croatian defence line on Vrbas river. After that conquest, Croatia reduced to around 37,000 km2. During the 18th century, Turkish rule in Bosnia and Herzegovina started to weaken, and after the Napoleonic Wars their rule rapidly decreased; the Ottoman Empire lost its demographic, civilization, and other reserves for military and territorial expansion, while the Austrian Empire, as the rest of the European countries, gained them.

From 1815 to 1878 the Ottoman authority in Bosnia and Herzegovina was decreasing. After the reorganization of the Ottoman army and abolition of the Janissaries, Bosnian nobility revolted, led by Husein Gradaščević, who wanted to establish autonomy in Bosnia and Herzegovina and stop any further social reforms. During the 19th Century, various reforms were made in order to increase freedom of religion which sharpened relations between Catholics and Muslims in Bosnia and Herzegovina. Soon, economic decay would happen and nationalist influence from Europe came to Bosnia and Herzegovina. Since the state administration was very disorganized and the national conscience was very strong among the Christian population, the Ottoman Empire lost control over Bosnia and Herzegovina. On 19 June 1875 Catholic Croats, led by Don Ivan Musić, revolted because of high taxes in West Herzegovina. Their goal was to subordinate Bosnia to the rule of the Emperor of Austria, respectively King of Croatia. During the revolt, for the first time, Bosnian Croats used the flag of Croatia. Soon after, the Orthodox population in East Herzegovina also revolted, which led to the Herzegovina Uprising. The Ottoman authorities were unable to defeat the rebels, so Serbia and Montenegro took advantage of this weakness and attacked the Ottoman Empire in 1876, soon after the Russian Empire did the same. The Turks lost the war in 1878, and this resulted in over 150,000 refugees who went to Croatia. After the Congress of Berlin was held in the same year, Bosnia and Herzegovina was transferred to the Austro-Hungarian Empire.

Austria-Hungary

Even after the fall of Ottoman rule, the population of Bosnia and Herzegovina was divided. In the Habsburg Kingdom of Croatia, Croatian politicians strived for the unification of the Kingdom of Dalmatia with Croatia. Another ambition of Croatian politicians was to incorporate the Condominium of Bosnia and Herzegovina into the Kingdom of Croatia. The Habsburg Governor Béni Kállay resorted to co-opting religious institutions. Soon, the Austrian Emperor gained support to name Orthodox metropolitans and Catholic bishops and to choose the Muslim hierarchy. The first Catholic archbishop was Josip Stadler. Both apostolic vicariates, Bosnian and Herzegovinian, were abolished, and instead, three dioceses were founded; Vrhbosna diocese with a seat in Sarajevo, Banja Luka diocese with a seat in Banja Luka and Mostar-Duvno diocese with a seat in Mostar.

At the time, Bosnia and Herzegovina were facing a Habsburg attempt at modernization. Between 180,000 and 200,000 people inhabited Bosnia and Herzegovina, the majority were Croats, Serbs, Muslims, and in smaller percentages Slovenes, Czechs and others. During this period, the most significant event is Bosnian entry into European political life and the shaping of ethnic Croats in Bosnia and Herzegovina into a modern nation. At the end of the 19th century, Bosnian Croats founded various reading, cultural and singing societies, and at the beginning of the 20th century, a new Bosnian Croat intelligentsia played a major role in the political life of Croats. The Croatian Support Society for Needs of Students of Middle Schools and High Schools in Bosnia and Herzegovina was founded in 1902, and in 1907 it was merged with the Croatian Society for Education of Children in Craft and Trade, also founded in 1902, into Croatian Cultural Society Napredak (Progress). Napredak educated and gave scholarships to more than 20,000 students. Students of Napredak were not only Bosnian Croats but also Croats from other regions.

Kallay tried to unify all Bosnians into a single nation of Bosniaks, but he failed to do so after Bosnians created their national political parties. Before the annexation of Bosnia and Herzegovina in 1908, the Croat People's Union (HNZ) become a political party; its ideology was very similar to that of the Croatian-Serbian Coalition in Croatia. In 1909, Stadler opposed such a policy and founded a new political party, the Croat Catholic Association (HKU), an opponent of the secular HNZ. HKU emphasized clerical ideals and religious exclusivity. However, Bosnian Croats mostly supported the secular nationalist policy of the HNZ. HNZ and Muslim Nation Organization formed a coalition that ruled the country from 1911 until the dissolution of the Bosnian parliament in 1914.

Kingdom of Yugoslavia

After World War I, Bosnia and Herzegovina became part of the internationally unrecognized State of Slovenes, Croats and Serbs which existed between October and December 1918. In December 1918, this state united with the Kingdom of Serbia as Kingdom of Serbs, Croats and Slovenes,which was renamed the Kingdom of Yugoslavia in 1929. This new state was characterized by Serbian nationalism, and was a form of "Greater Serbia". Serbs held control over the armed forces and the politics of the state. With around 40% of Serbs living in Bosnia and Herzegovina, the Serbian leadership of the state wanted to implement a Serbian hegemony in this region. Bosnian Croats constituted around a quarter of the total Bosnian population, but they did not have a single municipality president. The regime of the Kingdom of Yugoslavia was characterized by limited parliamentarism, drastic elective manipulations and later King Alexander's 6 January Dictatorship, state robbery present outside Serbia and political killings (Milan Šufflay, Ivo Pilar) and corruption. Yugoslavia was preoccupied with political struggles, which led to the collapse of the state after Dušan Simović organized a coup in March 1941 and after which Nazi Germany invaded Yugoslavia.

King Alexander was killed in 1934, which led to the end of the dictatorship. In 1939, faced with killings, corruption scandals, violence, and the failure of centralized policy, the Serbian leadership agreed on a compromise with the Croats. On 24 August 1939, the president of the Croatian Peasant Party, Vladko Maček and Dragiša Cvetković made an agreement (Cvetković-Maček agreement) according to which Banovina of Croatia was created on territory of Sava and Littoral Banovina and on districts of Dubrovnik, Šid, Brčko, Ilok, Gradačac, Derventa, Travnik and Fojnica. Around 30% of the present-day territory of Bosnia and Herzegovina becomes part of Banovina of Croatia. Those parts had a Croatian majority. The creation of Banovina of Croatia was one of the solutions to the "Croatian issue".

World War II

After the collapse of Yugoslavia amidst German and Italian invasion in April 1941, the Axis puppet state which encompassed the entire Bosnia and Herzegovina, Independent State of Croatia (NDH) under the radical Croatian nationalist Ustaše regime was established. Bosnian Croats were divided, as some supported the NDH, some actively opposed it by joining or supporting the Yugoslav Partisans, while others chose to wait, not attracted either by fascist Ustaše or communist-led resistance. After the Ustaše campaign of genocide and terror, targeting Serbs, Jews, and Roma, a brutal civil war ensued. At the same time, a parallel genocide against Croats and Bosniaks was carried out by the Yugoslav Royalist and Serbian nationalist Chetniks. The Ustaše regime also persecuted any opponents or dissidents among Bosnian Croats, especially communists, pre-war members of the now-banned Croatian Peasant Party, and those connected with the partisan resistance. The Ustaše executed many Bosnian Croats, for instance, resistance fighters and supporters Jakov Dugandžić, Mostar's Ljubo Brešan and 19-year old Mostar gymnasium student Ante Zuanić, as well as a prominent Mostar CPP member Blaž Slišković (in Jasenovac concentration camp). Prominent Croat communist intellectual from Bosnia, Ognjen Prica, was shot by Ustaše in Kerestinec prison. Families of Bosnian Croats who left to join the partisan resistance were usually interned or sent to concentration camps by Ustaše authorities.

Numerous Bosnian Croats joined the partisan movement, fighting against the Axis forces and the Ustaše regime. Some of them included people's heroes such as Franjo Kluz, Ivan Marković Irac, Stipe Đerek, Karlo Batko, Ante Šarić "Rade Španac" and others. From the very beginning of the uprising against the Axis, many Bosnian Croats became commanders of partisan units (e.g., Josip Mažar-Šoša, Ivica Marušić-Ratko etc.), even though the units themselves were predominantly composed of Serbs. The territory that partisans liberated and managed to keep under their control from November 1942 to January 1943 (dubbed the Republic of Bihać) included all of rural Western Herzegovina west of Neretva and Široki Brijeg, including Livno. Livno and its area, under partisan control from August to October 1942, was very important for Bosnian Croat resistance, as key CPP members Florijan Sučić and Ivan Pelivan joined the resistance and mobilized many other Croats. Bosnian Croats' representatives, among which Mostar lawyer Cvitan Spužević, also actively participated in the provisional assembly of the country, ZAVNOBiH (State Anti-fascist Council for the National Liberation of Bosnia and Herzegovina). ZAVNOBiH proclaimed the statehood of Bosnia-Herzegovina and the equality of Muslims, Croats, and Serbs in the country in its historic session in 1943. The first government of People's Republic of Bosnia and Herzegovina in 1945 included several prominent Croats - Jakov Grgurić (deputy prime minister), Cvitan Spužević (minister of construction),  Ante Babić (education), and Ante Martinović (forestry).

After the partisans liberated most of Yugoslavia and NDH collapsed in May 1945, some NDH soldiers and civilians retreated to the British-occupied zone in Austria. Many of them were killed in the Bleiburg repatriations. In the closing stages of the war and the immediate aftermath, some Bosnian Croats who previously supported the Ustaše regime or were merely perceived as potential opponents of the new communist Yugoslavia were persecuted or executed (notably, Herzegovina friars).

Total casualties and losses of Bosnian Croats in World War II and the aftermath are estimated at 64-79,000. According to the statistician Bogoljub Kočović, the relative war losses of Bosnian Croats, compared to their expected population in 1948, was 11.4%. According to the demographer Vladimir Žerjavić, 17,000 Bosnian Croats died in partisan ranks, 22,000 in NDH forces, while 25,000 lost their lives as civilians; of civilians, almost ¾ or 19,000 died as a result of Axis terror or in Ustaše concentration camps.

At the end of 1977, 8.8% of Bosnian recipients of veteran's pensions were Croats, while during the WWII Croats composed around 23% of the country's population.

Socialist Yugoslavia

After the war, Bosnia and Herzegovina became one of the 6 constitutive republics of Socialist Yugoslavia. Intensive state campaigns of nationalization of property, followed by industrialization and urbanization variously affected Bosnian Croats. While some centers and areas prospered, other rural areas underwent depopulation and urban flight, as well as (most notably in western Herzegovina) high rates of emigration to the Western world.

Officeholders usually rotated among the three ethnic communities in Bosnia and Herzegovina. In the 1980s, many Bosnian Croat politicians were in high positions - for instance, Ante Marković, Branko Mikulić, and Mato Andrić.

Bosnian War

Citizens of the Socialist Republic of Bosnia and Herzegovina voted for the independence of Bosnia and Herzegovina in the referendum that was held between 29 February and 1 March 1992. The referendum question was: "Are you in favor of a sovereign and independent Bosnia-Herzegovina, a state of equal citizens and nations of Muslims, Serbs, Croats, and others who live in it?" Independence was strongly favoured by Bosniak and Bosnian Croat voters, but the referendum was largely boycotted by Bosnian Serbs. The total turnout of voters was 63.6% of which 99.7% voted for the independence of Bosnia and Herzegovina.

On 5 April 1992, Serb forces started the Siege of Sarajevo. On 12 May, Yugoslav People's Army left Bosnia and Herzegovina and left most of the arms to the Army of Republika Srpska, headed by Ratko Mladić. The first unit to oppose Serb forces in Bosnia and Herzegovina was the Croatian Defence Forces (HOS) founded by Croatian Party of Rights of Bosnia and Herzegovina on 18 December 1991. The Croatian Community of Herzeg-Bosnia established its own force, the Croatian Defence Council (HVO) on 8 April 1992. HVO consisted of 20 to 30% of Bosniaks who joined HVO because local Muslim militias were unable to arm themselves. Croatian Community of Herzeg-Bosnia was founded on 18 November 1991 as a community of municipalities where the majority of the population were Croats. In its founding acts, Herzeg-Bosnia had no separatist character. The Croatian Republic of Herzeg-Bosnia was declared by the Bosnian Croat leadership as a temporary region, which after the war ended, would again become part of a united Bosnia and Herzegovina.

At the beginning of the Bosnian War, Bosnian Croats were first to organize themselves, especially Croats in western Herzegovina who were already armed. At the end of May 1992, Croats launched a counter-offensive, liberating Mostar after a month of fighting. Also, in central Bosnia and Posavina, Croatian forces stopped the Serbian advance, and in some places, they repelled the enemy. On 16 June 1992, the President of Croatia, Franjo Tuđman and the President of the Presidency of Bosnia and Herzegovina, Alija Izetbegović signed an alliance according to which, Bosnia and Herzegovina legalized the activity of Croatian Army and Croatian Defence Council on its territory. Bosnian Croat political leadership and the leadership of Croatia urged Izetbegović to form a confederation between Bosnia and Herzegovina and Croatia, but Izetbegović denied this since he tried to represent Serbian interests as well as those of Bosniaks and Croats. The Bosnian Croat leadership was irritated by Izetbegović's neutrality, so Mate Boban threatened to pull back the HVO from actions in Bosnia. Since the UN implemented an embargo on Bosnia and Herzegovina on the import of arms, Bosniak and Croat forces had difficulties fighting Serbian units, which were supplied with arms from the Middle East, just before the outbreak of war. However, after Croat and Bosniak forces reorganized in late May 1992, the Serbian advance was halted and their forces mostly remained in their positions during the war. The tensions between Croats and Bosniaks started on 19 June 1992, but the real war began in October.

The Croat-Bosniak War was at its peak in 1993. In March 1994, the Bosniak and Croat leadership signed the Washington agreement, according to which, the Army of the Republic of Bosnia and Herzegovina (ARBiH)-controlled and HVO-controlled areas were united into the Federation of Bosnia and Herzegovina. After the Washington agreement was signed, the Croatian Army, HVO and ARBiH liberated southwestern Bosnia and Herzegovina in seven military operations. In December 1995, the Bosnian War ended with the signing of the Dayton agreement. However, the same agreement caused problems in Bosnia and Herzegovina and was largely ineffective. According to the information published by the Research and Documentation Centre in Sarajevo, 7,762 Croats were killed or missing. From the territory of the Federation of Bosnia and Herzegovina, 230,000 Croats were expelled, while from the territory of Republika Srpska, 152,856 Croats were expelled.

Demographics

Comprising 15.43% of the country's population, Croats have been unequally spread across the area of Bosnia and Herzegovina. This has further been reflected and reinforced by the post-1995 political division of the country. Currently, according to the 2013 census, 91% of them live in the Federation of Bosnia and Herzegovina, while just 5.4% and 3.2% live in Republika Srpska and Brčko District, respectively. In Republika Srpska, Croat share in the entity population is just 2% (29,645), while in Brčko it stands at 20.7% (17,252). On the other hand, in the Federation of Bosnia and Herzegovina, Croats form 22.4% of the entity's population. Four out of ten Federal cantons have a Croat majority. All Croat-majority municipalities are located in this entity as well.

According to the Croatian Ministry of Interior, 384,631 Croatian citizens had registered residence in Bosnia and Herzegovina in July 2019.

Municipalities

However, Croats are further variously spread in the Federation itself. Most of the municipalities with a clear Croat majority form two compact regions. One is in the southwest of the country, along the border with Croatia, from Kupres and Livno in the northwest along West Herzegovina to Ravno in the southeast (Široki Brijeg, Ljubuški, Livno, Čitluk, Tomislavgrad, Čapljina, Posušje, Grude, Prozor-Rama, Stolac, Neum, Kupres, Ravno). Around 40% of the country's and 45% of the Federation's Croats live here. The second is Posavina Canton in the north (Orašje, Odžak, Domaljevac-Šamac). This canton's share of the Croat population is 6%. Other Croat-majority or -plurality municipalities are enclaves in Central Bosnia and around Zenica (Dobretići, Vitez, Busovača, Kiseljak, Usora, Kreševo, Žepče). In ethnically mixed Jajce and Novi Travnik in Central Bosnia, Croats form 46% of the population.

In Mostar area, Croats comprise the plurality of the population both in the municipality (48.4%) and the city itself (49%). Mostar is the largest city in Herzegovina and the city with the largest Croat population in the country (51,216 in the area and 29,475 in the urban district). Croats comprise an overwhelming majority in the western part of both the city and the entire municipality.

Croats comprise 41% of the population in Uskoplje, a third in Vareš and Pelagićevo, and a quarter in Glamoč and Donji Žabar. In Grahovo, Croats make up around 15% of the population.

In addition to that, 762 Croats form the plurality (40.4%) in the ethnically diverse small town of Glamoč.

Cantons
There are 4 Croat-majority cantons and in total 6 cantons in which Croats form more than 10% of the population.

Demographic history

Ottoman Empire

In 1624, there were around 450,000 Muslims (67%), 150,000 Catholics (22%) and 75,000 Orthodox Christians (11%). In 1776, according to Klaić, there were around 50,000 Catholics in Bosnia. However, the Turkish censuses were biased, and they only numbered the houses and later exclusively included the male population. Throughout this period, the Catholic majority persisted in the southwest of the country (western Herzegovina), parts of central Bosnia, and Posavina, mostly in rural areas.

Austria-Hungary and Kingdom of Yugoslavia
  
During Austro-Hungarian rule (1878–1918), the number and share of Croats started to slowly increase. Croats from Croatia moved to the country to work in the Austro-Hungarian administration or as teachers, doctors and officers. According to the Croatian author Vjekoslav Klaić, at the beginning of the period, in 1878, there were 646,678 Orthodox Christians (respectively Serbs, 48.4%), 480,596 Muslims (35.9%), 207,199 Catholics (respectively Croats, 15.5%) and 3,000 Jews (0.2%). In 1895, Bosnia and Herzegovina had 1,336,091 inhabitants, of which there were 571,250 Orthodox Christians (42.76%), 492,710 Muslims (36,88%), 265,788 Catholics (19.89%), 5,805 Jews (0.43%) and 53 others (0.04%). The slow process of nation-building on one hand and the Austrian-Hungarian administration's downplaying of ethnic differences and nationalism while trying to keep Croatian and Serbian influence on the country at bay, on the other hand, make it difficult to assess the actual ethnic allegiance at this period.

According to the 1931 census, Bosnia and Herzegovina had 2,323,787 inhabitants of which Serbs made 44.25%, Muslims 30.90%, Croats 23.58% and others made 1.02% of the total population.

Socialist Yugoslavia
The first Yugoslav census recorded a decreasing number of Croats; from the first census in 1948 to the last one in 1991, the percentage of Croatians decreased from 23% to 17.3%, even though the total number increased. According to the 1953 census, Croats were in the majority in territories which became part of Banovina of Croatia in 1939. Their total number was 654,229, which is 23,00% of the total population of Bosnia and Herzegovina. According to the 1961 census, Croats made up 21.7% of the total population, and their number was 711,660. After that, districts were divided into smaller municipalities.

According to the 1971 census, Croats were 20.6% of the total population, and their number was 772,491. According to the 1981 census, Croats made up 18.60% of the total population, and their number was 767,247. In comparison to the 1971 census, for the first time, the percentage of Croats was below 20%, and after 1981, their percentage continued to fall. From 1971 to 1991, the percentage of Croats fell due to emigration into Croatia and Western Europe. Nevertheless, the fall in population percentage is only absent in western Herzegovina municipalities where Croats account for more than 98% of the population. According to the 1991 census, Croats were 17.3% of the total population, and their number was 755,895.

Bosnian War

The total number of Croats in Bosnia and Herzegovina continued to fall, especially after the Bosnian War broke out in 1992. Soon, an exodus of Bosnian Croats occurred when a large number of Croats were expelled from central Bosnia and Posavina. According to the 1996 census, made by UNHCR and officially unrecognized, there were 571,317 Croats in the country (14.57%). In the territory of the Herzeg-Bosnia, the percentage of Croats slightly changed, although, their total number was reduced.

Education

The first educational institutions of Bosnian Croats were monasteries, of which the most significant were those in Kreševo, Fojnica, Kraljeva Sutjeska and Tolisa, and later monasteries in Herzegovina, of which most significant are those in Humac and Široki Brijeg. The most significant people working for the elementary education of Bosnian Croats in the 19th century were Ivan Franjo Jukić and Grgo Martić, who founded and organized elementary schools throughout Bosnia and Herzegovina.  In 1887, many elementary schools were founded in Bosnia and Herzegovina along with the Order of Sisters of St. Francis, whose classes were led methodologically and professionally, so Bosnian Croat schools were, at the end of the Ottoman era and beginning of Austrian-Hungarian occupation, the same as elementary schools in rest of Europe. The educational system of Bosnia and Herzegovina during communism was based on a mixture of nationalities and the suppression of Croat identity. With the foundation of the Croatian Community of Herzeg-Bosnia, Bosnian Croat schools took the educational system from Croatia.

At the same time, University Džemal Bijedić of Mostar was renamed to University of Mostar with Croatian as the official language. This university is the only one in Bosnia and Herzegovina to use Croatian as the official language. After signing the Dayton accords, jurisdiction over education in Republika Srpska was given to the RS Government, while in the Federation, jurisdiction over education was given to the cantons. In municipalities with a Croat majority or significant minority, schools with Croatian as an official language also exist, while in the territories where there is only a small number of Croats, Catholic centres perform education. Other education institutes are HKD Napredak, the Scientific Research Institute of the University of Mostar, the Croatian Lexicographic Institute of Bosnia and Herzegovina, and the Institute for Education in Mostar.

Language

Croats of Bosnia and Herzegovina speak Croatian, a standardized variety of Serbo-Croatian, spoken by the people of Yugoslavia.

Politics

State level

Croats of Bosnia and Herzegovina, as well as other two constitutive nations, have their representative in the Presidency of Bosnia and Herzegovina. The Presidency has three members, one Bosniak, one Croat, and one Serb. Bosniak and Croat are elected in the Federation of Bosnia and Herzegovina, while Serb is elected in the Republika Srpska.

The current Croat member of the Presidency is Željko Komšić of the DF.

The Parliamentary Assembly of Bosnia and Herzegovina has two chambers, House of Representatives and House of Peoples. House of Peoples has 15 members, five Bosniaks, five Croats, and five Serbs. Bosniak and Croat members of the House of Peoples are elected in the Parliament of the Federation of Bosnia and Herzegovina, while five Serb members are elected in the National Assembly of Republika Srpska. The 42 members of the House of Representatives are elected directly by voters, two-thirds are from the Federation while one-third is from the Republika Srpska.

Federal level

The Parliament of the Federation of Bosnia and Herzegovina consists also of two chambers, House of Representatives, which consists of 98 members, and House of Peoples that consists of 58 members.

Members of the House of Representatives are elected directly by the citizens of Bosnia and Herzegovina, while members of the House of Peoples are selected by the cantonal assemblies. There are 17 representatives in the House of Peoples of each constitutive nation, Bosniaks, Croats, and Serbs. Other 7 representatives are those of national minorities.

In electing the President and two Vice-Presidents of the Federation, at least one-third of the delegates of the respective Bosniak, Croat or Serb caucuses in the House of Peoples may nominate the President and two Vice presidents of the Federation. The election for the President and two Vice Presidents of the Federation shall require the joint approval of the list of three nominees, by a majority vote in the House of Representatives, and then by a majority vote in the House of Peoples, including the majority of each constituent people's caucus. Current President of the Federation of Bosnia and Herzegovina is Marinko Čavara of the Croatian Democratic Union.

The Government of the Federation of Bosnia and Herzegovina needs to be composed of 16 ministers, 8 Bosniaks, 5 Croats and 3 Serbs.

In January 2017, Croatian National Assembly stated that "if Bosnia and Herzegovina wants to become self-sustainable, then it is necessary to have an administrative-territorial reorganization, which would include a federal unit with a Croatian majority. It remains the permanent aspiration of the Croatian people of Bosnia and Herzegovina."

Political parties
Currently, there are several Croatian political parties in Bosnia and Herzegovina, many corresponding to parties within Croatia itself. The Croatian Democratic Union of Bosnia and Herzegovina (HDZ BiH), Croatian Democratic Union 1990 (HDZ 1990) are the most popular parties.

HDZ was founded in 1990 and is a major political party among the Croats of Bosnia and Herzegovina, being the most powerful during the Bosnian War (1992–1995) and the existence of the Croatian Republic of Herzeg-Bosnia (1991–1994). HDZ is Christian democratic, conservative and pro-Europeanist political party.

HDZ 1990 is a split party of the Croatian Democratic Union, founded in 2006, however, their ideology is very similar to one of the HDZ. HDZ 1990 is also Christian democratic and pro-Europeanist.

Open issues 

A conference was held in Neum, Bosnia and Herzegovina on October 27 and 28, 2005, under the title "Constitutional position of Croats in Bosnia and Herzegovina - language, education, culture, and media".

It was organized by the University of Mostar and the Croatian Society of Arts and Science. It produced the Declaration of the constitutional-law position of Croats in Bosnia and Herzegovina. (The words "constitutional-law position" refer to the position of Croats as one of the constitutive nations of Bosnia and Herzegovina). President Ivo Miro Jović sponsored the conference and it also received support from many other organizations.

The Declaration produced several demands about the equal treatment of the Croatian population in Bosnia and Herzegovina. Most significant of these was the creation of three republics within the nation:

 "Starting from the scientific cognition and practical experiences, we think, that in consultation with the representatives of Serbian and Bosniak people and the International Community, we should organize Bosnia and Herzegovina as a compound federal state, composed of three federal units and three levels of government. Since only the republic, as a democratic form of the rule of nations, includes and guarantees the highest level of democracy, political, cultural, and every other autonomy, we pledge for the establishment of three republics for three sovereign nations, which is in full accordance with the provisions of the United Nations Pact on the civil, social and cultural rights to the equality of all nations regardless of their numerousness."

The Declaration upheld the right to learn Croatian in school as well as the need for the preservation of their people's culture. Another important issue was the need for a Croat television station within the country.

Culture

Art

In the area near the Neretva river, a Hellenised Illyrian tribe, the Daorsi, spread cultural influences from Greece. Their capital Daorson on Oršćani near Stolac is today the most significant center of antic culture in Bosnia and Herzegovina. The complex of the terraced shrine near Gradac near Posušje, built in 183, was dedicated to a dead Roman Emperor, Marcus Aurelius. Late Roman art in Bosnia and Herzegovina was characterized by the building of villas, Christian mausoleums, basilicas, and oratories like Vila "Mogorjelo" near Čapljina (early 4th century). The influence of romanesque architecture arrived in Bosnia and Herzegovina across Croatia, but it was never completely accepted, only its elements were used. Such buildings are St. Luke's Tower in Jajce (15th century) or motives of stećak tombstones. Valuable manuscripts of Bosnian origin occur at this time.

Hrvoje's Missal is the most significant artwork of the medieval Bosnian Croats, written in the 15th century. During the 15th and 16th centuries, Bosnia and Herzegovina was under Ottoman rule, which destroyed the influence of the Renaissance and Baroque, the impact of which was only present in Franciscan monasteries in Visoko, Kreševo, Fojnica, and Kraljeva Sutjeska. The first Bosnian Croat painters were educated in European academies in Vienna, Munich, Prague, Krakow, Budapest and Paris. Their education was funded by HKD Napredak. The most famous Bosnian Croat painters are Gabrijel Jurkić, Karlo Mijić, Branko Radulović, and Petar Šain. Statuary was reduced to the memorial portraits, of which the most famous is that of Robert Frangeš-Mihanović and Sputani genije, a statue on the grave of Silvije Strahimir Kranjčević built by Rudolf Valdec. After World War II, the Association of Artists of Bosnia and Herzegovina was founded along with the Painting State School and Sarajevo Art Gallery. Architectural Regionalism is seen in the 1970s in buildings such as the department stores Razvitak in Mostar (1970) and in Jajce (1976). The best example of Functionalism is the multiple award-winning hotel Ruža in Mostar (1979).

Literature

Bosnian Croat literature consists of works written in Croatian by authors who originated from Bosnia and Herzegovina and are considered part of Croatian literature. It consists of pre-Ottoman literature (first written monuments, texts of the Bosnian Church, diplomatic and law documents, manuscripts on tombstones), Bosna Srebrena literature (prayer books, catechisms, collections of sermons, biographies of saints, monastery yearbooks, first historical works, poems and memoirs, travel books, grammars of Latin and Croatian, and lexicographic works), national awakening literature (the foundation of various associations, reading rooms, libraries in which writing courses were held), the literature of Bosnian Muslims (various Bosniak writers made a significant impact on Croatian literature and were influenced by other Croat authors) and modern Bosnian Croat literature.

The best known contributors to the Bosnian Croat literature are Ivan Aralica, Matija Divković, Mirko Kovač, Ivo Kozarčanin, Silvije Strahimir Kranjčević, Tomislav Ladan, Vitomir Lukić, Grgo Martić, Matija Mažuranić, and Antun Branko Šimić.

Music

The traditional music of Croats of Bosnia and Herzegovina is related to ganga, klapa, gusle, tamburica and šargija. Those ways of singing and musical instruments are part of the Bosnian Croat national identity. Ganga, klapa, and gusle are most widespread on the territory of western Herzegovina, even though they can be seen in eastern Herzegovina and Bosnia. Tamburica is popular in Posavina and central Bosnia. Šargija is widespread in northern Bosnia, from Posavina to Olovo and Vareš.

The most known singers of modern Bosnian Croat music are Željko Bebek and Jura Stublić. Some new known singers include Mate Bulić, Ivan Mikulić, Nikša Bratoš, Ivana Marić, the Feminnem girl band, and others. Some other well-known Croatian singers originate from Bosnia and Herzegovina, including Ivo Fabijan, Boris Novković, Vesna Pisarović and others. There are two significant music festivals, Melodije Mostara (Melodies of Mostar) and Etnofest Neum on which musicians from Croatia also participate. Alongside traditional music, some other musical genres also developed, like heavy metal, hip hop, house
and techno.

Religion

Croats are the core of the Catholic Church in Bosnia and Herzegovina. The metropolitan diocese is the Archdiocese of Vrhbosna. There are also dioceses centered in Banja Luka and Mostar, of which Mostar is the largest. Vinko Puljić is the current Cardinal and Archbishop of Vrhbosna. The Sacred Heart Cathedral in Sarajevo is the largest cathedral in Bosnia and Herzegovina, and is the seat of the Roman Catholic Archdiocese of Vrhbosna. The other three Roman Catholic cathedrals in Bosnia and Herzegovina are the Cathedral of Saint Bonaventure in Banja Luka, the Cathedral of Mary, Mother of the Church in Mostar, and the Cathedral of the Birth of Mary in Trebinje.

There are numerous monasteries throughout the region. The oldest is the 14th century Monastery of the Holy Spirit located in Fojnica in central Bosnia, which houses a large library filled with many historical documents dating back to medieval Bosnia. Two other well-known monasteries are the Guča Gora Monastery near Travnik and Kraljeva Sutjeska Monastery near Kakanj, both located in central Bosnia. The rest of the monasteries in the region are the Monastery of St. Anthony in Sarajevo, the Monastery of St. Mark in Derventa, Gorica Monastery in Livno, and the Assumption of Mary Monastery in Prozor-Rama. Oldest saved church in Bosnia is Old Church of St. Michael in Vareš. It has been built before the 16th century.
The parish of Međugorje is a significant Marian shrine which attracts approximately one million visitors annually. It became a popular site of religious pilgrimage due to reports of apparitions of the Virgin Mary to six local Catholics in 1981. Over a thousand hotel and hostel beds are available for religious tourism.

Sports

Croatian-run clubs are well represented in terms of national championships in relation to the percentage of Croats in the population. In football, HŠK Zrinjski Mostar, NK Široki Brijeg, NK Žepče, HŠK Posušje, and HNK Orašje are some of the most successful. Collectively, they have won three national Cup and five national Championships since the national competition began in 2000. Other Croatian-run clubs are NK Brotnjo, NK SAŠK Napredak, NK Ljubuški, HNK Sloga Uskoplje. The clubs are often among the nation's most multi-ethnic.

Prior to 2000, the Croats ran their own unapproved football league. However, they have joined the UEFA-approved Football Association of Bosnia and Herzegovina's league system. Bosnia and Herzegovina has produced many successful internationals, both for the Croatian national team and the national team of Bosnia and Herzegovina.

See also 

 Croats
 List of Croats
 Turkish Croatia
 Christian tattooing in Bosnia and Herzegovina

References
Citations

Bibliography

 
 
 
 
 
 
 
 
 
 
 
 
 
 
 
 
 
 
 
 
 
 
 
 
 
 
 
 
 
 

 
Croat people
Ethnic groups in Bosnia and Herzegovina